Megadromus capito is a large endemic ground beetle from New Zealand. This beetle hunts on the ground, is active mainly at night and tends to take shelter under debris during the day.

Taxonomy
M. capito was first described by Adam White in 1846.

Description
M. capito is a shiny, black beetle with a thorax cover that can have a greenish appearance. The beetle has horizontal linear groves running the length of its wing covers. They are sexually dimorphic in that the males are significantly larger than the females.

Life cycle 
M. capito have relatively low numbers of eggs, up to 26, which they gestate for at least six months.

M. capito are regarded as being a long lived species of beetle.

References

External links

Detailed image of M. capito.
Citizen Science observations of M. capito

Pterostichinae
Beetles of New Zealand
Beetles described in 1846
Endemic fauna of New Zealand
Endemic insects of New Zealand